The 2013 Bikini Basketball Association season was the first season of the Bikini Basketball Association. The regular season began on June 22 and ended on August 17 with a championship series on September 21. While the Miami Spice went 5–0 to claim the regular season crown they were defeated by the Illinois Heart in the championship game.

Regular season
The league began its inaugural season on June 22, 2013, with five teams of women selected for looks, personality, and playing ability. In late June 2013, the Philadelphia Diamonds shut down before their inaugural game. This reduced the league to four teams playing a combined total of 12 games over 10 weeks. The Miami Spice went 5–0, the Illinois Heart went 3–2, the Houston Inferno struggled to a 1–4 finish, and the Las Vegas Fantasy went 0–3 before folding in late July 2013. The Las Vegas collapse further reduced the number of completed games in the inaugural regular season to 9.

Playoffs
Several weeks after the regular season ended, the league announced that the three surviving teams would compete in a two-game single-elimination tournament at the Kroc Center in Chicago on September 21, 2013. The Illinois Heart defeated the Houston Inferno 94–77 to advance to the championship later that day. Illinois defeated the regular season champion Miami Spice 96–89 to claim the league championship.

2013 schedule

Regular season

Championship

League standings
{| class="wikitable" style="text-align:center"
|-
! colspan="10" style="vertical-align:middle;" | 2013 Bikini Basketball Association standings
|-
!width="160"| 
!width="30"| 
!width="30"| 
!width="30"| 
!width="30"| 
!width="30"| 
!width="30"| 

|- 
| style="text-align:left;" | Miami Spice           || 5 || 0 || 0 || 1.000 || 0.0 || W5

|- 
| style="text-align:left;" | Illinois Heart        || 3 || 2 || 0 || 0.600 || 2.0 || W1

|- 
| style="text-align:left;" | Houston Inferno       || 1 || 4 || 0 || 0.200 || 4.0 || L4

|- 
| style="text-align:left;" | Las Vegas Fantasy (folded) || 0 || 3 || 0 || 0.000 || 4.0 || L3

|}

References

External links 

Bikini Basketball Association official website

Bikini Basketball Association seasons
2013 in American women's basketball
2012–13 in American basketball by league
2013–14 in American basketball by league